Uta or UTA may refer to:

Universities 
University of Texas at Arlington, in the United States
University of Texas at Austin, in the United States
University of Tarapacá, in Chile
University of Tampere, in Finland

Sports 
 FC UTA Arad, a Romanian football club based in the town of Arad
 A common abbreviation in box scores and television on-screen graphics for the American basketball team Utah Jazz

Organizations 
Ulster Transport Authority
Union de Transports Aériens, a defunct French airline
Union des Transports Africains de Guinée, a Guinean and Lebanese joint venture
United Talent Agency, a Hollywood talent agency
Central UTA of Monsey, a Hasidic school in Airmont, New York
United Telekom Austria
Urban Transit Authority
Utah Transit Authority, a public transportation agency
The United Companies of the Train of Artillery of the Town of Providence

Places
Uta, Sardinia, a comune in the Province of Cagliari, Italy
Uta, Indonesia, a coastal village in Papua
Ūta, a village in Lithuania

People 
 Uta (name)

Other uses
Urological (or Urogenital) teaching associate, in medical education
 Uta, another name for the skin condition cutaneous leishmaniasis
Uta, genus of New World lizards known as side-blotched lizards
A form of Japanese poetry, usually called waka
Upper tangent arc, an atmospheric optical phenomenon
, Romanian name for autonomous territorial unit, a type of administrative division in Moldova